Sri Mara (Cham: ꨦꨴꨫ ꨠꨩꨣ, Khmer: ឝ្រី មារ,  fl. 137 or 192 AD) was the founder of the kingdom of Champa.

Biography
He is known in Chinese records as Qū Lián (區連), or Zhulian, which in Vietnamese pronunciation is Khu Liên (also 區連). Attempts have also been made to identify Sri Mara with Fan Shiman (范師蔓) of Funan (circa 230 CE). on a stele recorded as Sri Mara (Chinese 释利摩罗).

He was born in Tượng Lâm (Vietnamese pronunciation of Chinese 象林, in what is today Thừa Thiên Huế province in Central Vietnam) an area of tension between the Han Dynasty and the natives of Lâm Ấp (Vietnamese pronunciation of Chinese Lin Yi 林邑, the precursor to Champa). In 137 or 192 AD, he defeated the Chinese prefect and declared himself king of Lin-yi. This is considered the official founding of Champa, though Cham legend dates the founding to be much earlier.

In 248, he led the Cham in looting and razing Jiaozhi and Cửu Chân.  The Cham then defeated the fleet sent to repulse them, at Bay of the Battle.

See also
 History of Champa

References

Kings of Champa
2nd-century Vietnamese people